OBOS may stand for:
 Obos (fountain), a sculptural fountain by George Tsutakawa at the Jefferson National Life Building in downtown Indianapolis, Indiana
 Our Bodies, Ourselves, a book by Boston Women's Health Book Collective first published in 1971
 Oslo Bolig- og Sparelag, a Norwegian housing company founded by Martin Strandli
 OpenBeOS, an operating system now known as Haiku